Newton Township is a township in Winnebago County, Iowa, in the USA.

History
Newton Township was founded in 1881. It was likely named for Newton H. Bailey, a pioneer settler.

References

Townships in Winnebago County, Iowa
Townships in Iowa